An island country, island state, or island nation is a country whose primary territory consists of one or more islands or parts of islands. Approximately 25% of all independent countries are island countries. Island countries are historically more stable than many continental states but are vulnerable to conquest by naval superpowers.

There are great variations between island country economies: they may rely mainly on extractive industries, such as mining, fishing and agriculture, and/or on services such as transit hubs, tourism, and financial services. Many islands have low-lying geographies and their economies and population centers develop along coast plains and ports; such states may be vulnerable to the effects of climate change, especially sea level rise.

Remote or significant islands and archipelagos that are not themselves sovereign are often known as dependencies or overseas territories.

Politics
Historically, island countries have tended to be less prone to political instability than their continental counterparts. The percentage of island countries that are democratic is higher than that of continental countries.

Island territories
While island countries by definition are sovereign states, there are also several islands and archipelagos around the world that operate semi-autonomously from their official sovereign states. These are often known as dependencies or overseas territories and can be similar in nature to proper island countries.

War
Island countries have often been the basis of maritime conquest and historical rivalry between other countries.
Island countries are more susceptible to attack by large, continental countries due to their size and dependence on sea and air lines of communication.
Many island countries are also vulnerable to predation by mercenaries and other foreign invaders,
although their isolation also makes them a difficult target.

Natural resources
Many developing small island countries rely heavily on fish for their main supply of food.
Some are turning to renewable energy—such as wind power, hydropower, geothermal power and biodiesel from copra oil—to defend against potential rises in oil prices.

Geography
Some island countries are more affected than other countries by climate change, which produces problems such as reduced land use, water scarcity, and sometimes even resettlement issues. Some low-lying island countries are slowly being submerged by the rising water levels of the Pacific Ocean.
Climate change also impacts island countries by causing natural disasters such as tropical cyclones, hurricanes, flash floods and droughts.

Climate change

Economics

Many island countries rely heavily on imports and are greatly affected by changes in the global economy. Due to the nature of island countries their economies are often characterised by being smaller, relatively isolated from world trade and economy, more vulnerable to shipping costs, and more likely to suffer environmental damage to infrastructure; exceptions include Japan, Taiwan and the United Kingdom.
The dominant industry for many island countries is tourism.

Composition
Island countries are typically small with low populations, although some, like Indonesia and Japan, are notable exceptions.

Some island countries are centred on one or two major islands, such as the United Kingdom, Trinidad and Tobago, New Zealand, Cuba, Bahrain, Singapore, Sri Lanka, Iceland, Malta, and Taiwan. Others are spread out over hundreds or thousands of smaller islands, such as Indonesia, the Philippines, The Bahamas, Seychelles, and the Maldives. Some island countries share one or more of their islands with other countries, such as the United Kingdom and Ireland; Haiti and the Dominican Republic; and Indonesia, which shares islands with Papua New Guinea, Brunei, East Timor, and Malaysia. Bahrain, Singapore, and the United Kingdom have fixed links such as bridges and tunnels to the continental landmass: Bahrain is linked to Saudi Arabia by the King Fahd Causeway, Singapore to Malaysia by the Johor–Singapore Causeway and Second Link, and the United Kingdom has a railway connection to France through the Channel Tunnel.

Geographically, the country of Australia is considered a continental landmass rather than an island, covering the largest landmass of the Australian continent. In the past, however, it was considered an island country for tourism purposes (among others) and is sometimes referred to as such.

See also

Archipelagic state
Effects of climate change on island nations
Landlocked country
List of Caribbean island countries by population
List of island countries
List of islands by area
List of islands by country
List of sovereign states and dependent territories in Oceania
List of sovereign states and dependent territories in the Indian Ocean
Microstate
City state
Pacific Islands Forum
Small Island Developing States
Thalassocracy

References

 
Island nation
Types of countries

is:Eyríki